The Val Borbera ( or Borbéia) is a valley formed by the River Borbera, a tributary of the Scrivia, located in the province of Alessandria. It was historically linked to the Republic of Genoa, the Ligurian Republic and is still strongly tied to Liguria.

Geography 
This valley is wedged between Val Boreca (Piacenza) to the east; Val Vobbia, Val Brevenna and Alta Val Trebbia (Genoa) and Valle Spinti (Alessandria and Genoa) to the south; and Val Curone, Val Grue and Valley Ossona (Alessandria) to the north. It is bordered to the west by Valle Scrivia.

History 

The valley is surrounded by high mountains, making it a place isolated from the surrounding valleys, little touched by industrialization and with a well-preserved environment. Up until the beginning of the 20th century, there was no road connecting the upper with the lower valley, the main passageway being the gravel riverbed in the dry season. It is the only valley of Piedmont bordering on the Emilia-Romagna region.

Until about the 1950s, viticulture was very widespread, especially in the lower valley. Today, a special grape variety is still cultivated in the valley, the Timorasso, which is known and appreciated even outside the valley. There are a lot of chestnut woods in the valley, but chestnuts are no longer harvested as before. Also, the water mills in the valley are no longer in operation, so chestnut flour is now produced outside the valley. Val Borbera is also known for a special kind of potatoes, namely the patata quarantina bianca genovese, and the fagiolane, a rather large, white bean that is very appreciated and used gastronomically in the Province of Alessandria.

Its population has been considered a genetic isolate.

References 

Borbera